The V-League 4th Season 1st Conference is a tournament of the Shakey's V-League. The tournament began last May 17, 2007 and ended on July 3, 2007 with the UST Tigresses winning two games to none against the SSC-R Lady Stags.

Tournament Format
Single Round Robin Tournament
Top five teams will compete in the semi-finals
Top two teams with the best record after the single-round robin semi-finals will advance to the finals
If a team won 3 out of 4 games, they will have a chance for a playoff berth against the second seed team for the finals
Best of Three Championship series

Starting Line-ups

Current standings

Elimination round

Semi-finals Berth Playoff
Adamson University and De La Salle University faced off in a playoff match to determine who will get the last semi-finals slot.

The other slots have been taken by Lyceum of the Philippines University, San Sebastian College - Recoletos, University of Santo Tomas and Ateneo de Manila University.

Semi-finals

Semi-finals standings

Finals Berth Playoffs
San Sebastian College - Recoletos and De La Salle University faced-off in a playoff match to determine who will get the last finals slot.

The other slot had already been taken by University of Santo Tomas; winning 8 out of 11 games and sweeping the semi-finals game. They lost by only a single set to Ateneo de Manila University.

San Sebastian College - Recoletos won also 8 out of 11 games all in all but failed to win 3 out of 4 games in the semi-finals. De La Salle University, even though they won only 6 out of 11 games, had been given a chance for a playoffs against San Sebastian College - Recoletos because they won 3 semi-final games out of 4 games.

Lyceum of the Philippines University and Ateneo de Manila University had been eliminated in the finals contention for failing to win three wins out of four games and with a lower standing than University of Santo Tomas, San Sebastian College - Recoletos and De La Salle University.

Among the eight teams this season, Adamson University, Far Eastern University and Colegio de San Juan de Letran were the first ones to be eliminated.

Championship Games
San Sebastian College - Recoletos had defeated De La Salle University and denied them the chance to have a 4-peat championship to face the University of Santo Tomas for the Finals. The Finals will feature the UAAP CHAMPION University of Santo Tomas and the NCAA CHAMPION San Sebastian College - Recoletos, the two most prestigious collegiate leagues in the Philippines. The reign and dominance of De La Salle University has ended and not to mention both University of Santo Tomas and San Sebastian College - Recoletos are the losing finalists to then mighty and powerful De La Salle University squad in the past seasons.

Awardees
 
Best Setter -  Maria Theresa Iratay (SSC)
Best Server -  Karla Bello (ADMU)
Best Digger -  Mary Jane Pepito (SSC)
Best Receiver -  Sheila Marga (LPU)
Best Blocker -   Michelle Laborte (ADMU)
Best Attacker -  Mary Jean Balse (UST)
Best Scorer -   Jaroensri Bualee (SSC)
Finals Most Valuable Player -  Mary Jean Balse (UST)
MOST VALUABLE PLAYER-  Jaroensri Bualee (SSC)

Shakey's V-League conferences
2007 in Philippine sport
2007 in volleyball